Robert Oscar Knop (1896-1952) was a professional American football player who played running back for eight seasons for the Chicago Tigers, the Hammond Pros, and the Chicago Bears.

During a 1924 Bears game against the Columbus Tigers, Knop intercepted a pass and was turned around, inadvertently causing him to start running towards his own end zone before teammate Ed Healey dived and tackled him at the goal line. Fellow Bear Joey Sternaman recalled in 1991, "The entire Tiger team just stood there and watched as he started running the wrong way. Most of them were laughing, I think. I took off after him, yelling, but I guess he couldn't hear me." The following year, Knop joined the Bears and Red Grange on their barnstorming tour.

References

1896 births
Players of American football from Chicago
American football running backs
Chicago Tigers players
Hammond Pros players
Chicago Bears players
Illinois Fighting Illini football players
1952 deaths